The following roads are numbered 111:

Canada 
 New Brunswick Route 111
 Nova Scotia Highway 111
 Prince Edward Island Route 111
 Quebec Route 111

Costa Rica
 National Route 111

England 
 A111 road

Philippines
 N111 highway (Philippines)

United States 
 U.S. Route 111 (former)
 Alabama State Route 111
 Arkansas Highway 111
 California State Route 111
 Connecticut Route 111
 Florida State Road 111
 Georgia State Route 111
 Illinois Route 111
 Indiana State Road 111
 K-111 (Kansas highway)
 Kentucky Route 111
 Louisiana Highway 111
 Maine State Route 111
 Massachusetts Route 111
 M-111 (Michigan highway) (former)
 Minnesota State Highway 111
 Missouri Route 111
Missouri Route 111 (1929) (former)
 Nebraska Highway 111 (former)
 New Hampshire Route 111
 New Hampshire Route 111A
 County Route 111 (Bergen County, New Jersey)
 County Route 111 (Ocean County, New Jersey)
 New Mexico State Road 111
 New York State Route 111
 County Route 111 (Albany County, New York)
 County Route 111 (Cortland County, New York)
 County Route 111 (Dutchess County, New York)
 County Route 111 (Erie County, New York)
 County Route 111 (Fulton County, New York)
 County Route 111 (Jefferson County, New York)
 County Route 111 (Niagara County, New York)
 County Route 111 (Steuben County, New York)
 County Route 111 (Suffolk County, New York)
 County Route 111 (Sullivan County, New York)
 North Carolina Highway 111
 Ohio State Route 111
 Tennessee State Route 111 
 Texas State Highway 111
 Texas State Highway Loop 111
 Texas State Highway Spur 111 (former)
 Farm to Market Road 111
 Utah State Route 111
 Vermont Route 111
 Virginia State Route 111
 Virginia State Route 111 (1923-1928) (former)
 Virginia State Route 111 (1928-1933) (former)
 Washington State Route 111 (former)
 Wisconsin Highway 111
 Wyoming Highway 111

Territories
 Puerto Rico Highway 111
 Puerto Rico Highway 111R (former)

See also
A111
Bundesstraße 111
D111 road
China National Highway 111
P111
R111 road (Ireland)
S111 (Amsterdam)